Ronnie Nolan (born 22 October 1933 in Ringsend, Dublin) is an Irish former International footballer.

After earning one schoolboy cap in 1949 and captaining the international youths twice he made his Shamrock Rovers debut on 1 September 1952 in a Dublin City Cup game against Drumcondra. He went on to become part of the teams of the 1950s and was the scorer of a last minute winning goal in the 1956 FAI Cup final against Cork Athletic. The side, popularly known as Coad's Colts, enjoyed many memorable days during the 1950s, but that day was surely that side's most dramatic. He played in the club's first 18 games in European competition.

He shared a benefit game with Shay Keogh in May 1961.

The great service of Ronnie Nolan to Rovers was marked by the presentation of a gold medal by the directors. This was a medal which was presented to any Rovers player who had 15 consecutive years service to the club.

Ronnie Nolan also had a spell as player/assistant manager at Bohemians during which time he picked up another FAI Cup winners medal in 1970. In all he played in 13 FAI Cup Finals.

A strong, uncompromising defender, Ronnie won 10 caps for the Republic of Ireland national football team. His first cap came on 3 October 1956 in a 2–1 win over Denmark at Dalymount Park in a World Cup qualifying game. He also won two Republic of Ireland B caps, scoring on his debut in Iceland in 1958 and won a record 33 League of Ireland XI caps.

He also coached Bank of Ireland in the Leinster Senior League Senior Division and coached the team to an All Ireland IBOA cup winning performance.

Ronnie Nolan worked in the Irish Glass Bottle Co Ltd in Ringsend Dublin while he continued his football career. Ronnie worked in the mould repair shop and became Mould Shop manager until his eventual retirement.

Ronnie was also a member of Newlands Golf Club and an enthusiastic and capable golfer and all round great sportsman and also a gentleman.

The FAI unveiled a commemorative alcove in his honour in August 2009.

Honours

League of Ireland: 4
 Shamrock Rovers 1953/54, 1956/57, 1958/59, 1963/64
FAI Cup: 7
 Shamrock Rovers 1955, 1956, 1962, 1964, 1965, 1966
 Bohemians 1970
League of Ireland Shield: 8
 Shamrock Rovers - 1954/55, 1955/56, 1956/57, 1957/58, 1962/63, 1963/64, 1964/65, 1965/66
Leinster Senior Cup (football)
 Shamrock Rovers - 1963/64
Dublin City Cup: 7
 Shamrock Rovers - 1952/53, 1954/55, 1956/57, 1957/58 1959/60, 1963/64, 1966/67
  Top Four Cup: 3
 Shamrock Rovers 1955/56, 1957/58, 1965/66
Hall of Fame
 Shamrock Rovers - 1993

References

Sources 
 The Hoops by Paul Doolan and Robert Goggins
 The Complete Who's Who of Irish International Football, 1945-96 (1996):Stephen McGarrigle

1937 births
Living people
League of Ireland players
Association footballers from Dublin (city)
Republic of Ireland association footballers
Republic of Ireland international footballers
Republic of Ireland youth international footballers
Republic of Ireland B international footballers
Shamrock Rovers F.C. players
Bohemian F.C. players
United Soccer Association players
Boston Rovers players
League of Ireland XI players
Dublin University A.F.C. coaches
Association football defenders
Republic of Ireland football managers
Association football coaches